Reece Devine (born 18 December 2001) is an English professional footballer who plays as a left-back for League Two club Swindon Town.

Career
After playing youth football with Wolverhampton Wanderers, Manchester City and Manchester United, Devine moved on loan to Scottish club St Johnstone in July 2021. He returned to his parent club in January 2022.

On 28 January 2022, Devine joined League Two side Walsall on a loan deal until the end of the 2021–22 season.

After his release from Manchester United, it was announced in June 2022 that he would sign for Swindon Town on 1 July 2022. In March 2023, he was ruled out for 4 months due following a hamstring injury.

Career statistics

References

2001 births
Living people
English footballers
Association football fullbacks
Wolverhampton Wanderers F.C. players
Manchester City F.C. players
Manchester United F.C. players
St Johnstone F.C. players
Walsall F.C. players
Scottish Professional Football League players
Swindon Town F.C. players
English Football League players